Baidoa District is a district in the southern Bay region of Somalia. Its capital is Baidoa.

References

External links
 Districts of Somalia
 Administrative map of Baidoa District

Districts of Somalia

Bay, Somalia